Gaetano Perillo (1897–1975) was a 20th-century Italian politician from Genoa, northern Italy.

20th-century Italian politicians
1897 births
1975 deaths
Politicians from Genoa